The Louisiana International Gulf Transfer Terminal is an approved project for a container port at the mouth of the Mississippi.  It will be at mile-marker zero and allow container ships with 70-foot drafts – and unlimited lengths, widths, and heights.

It is designed to improve the supply chain of container on barge shipments on the Mississippi River and tributaries that are navigable in 32 states.

See also
Ohio River
Missouri River
Illinois River
Port of New Orleans
List of locks and dams of the Upper Mississippi River
List of locks and dams of the Ohio River
Container on barge

References

External links
https://finance.yahoo.com/news/u-government-approves-louisiana-international-230900189.html

New Orleans